Abdula Memedi (born 24 April 1952) is a Yugoslav wrestler. He competed in the men's freestyle 82 kg at the 1980 Summer Olympics.

References

External links
 

1952 births
Living people
Yugoslav male sport wrestlers
Olympic wrestlers of Yugoslavia
Wrestlers at the 1980 Summer Olympics
Place of birth missing (living people)